176th meridian may refer to:

176th meridian east, a line of longitude east of the Greenwich Meridian
176th meridian west, a line of longitude west of the Greenwich Meridian